Mamadou Tounkara may refer to:

 Mamadou Tounkara (footballer, born 1996), Spanish football forward for Avellino
 Mamadou Tounkara (footballer, born 2001), French football centre-back for Vitória Guimarães